Ballivor (/'bælaɪvər/ BAL-eyevər) is a village in County Meath, Ireland. It had a population of 1,809 at the 2016 census. It is located on the R156 regional road between the towns of Mullingar and Trim.

Public transport
Bus Éireann route 115A provided a commuter link from Ballivor to Dublin via Summerhill and Maynooth with one journey in the morning and an evening journey back every day except Sunday. Until 24 August 2013 (inclusive) Bus Éireann route 118 provided a daily commuter service from to/from Dublin via Dunboyne and a daily service to/from Mullingar. As of 2022 Bus Eireann route 115C provides service to Mullingar and Kilcock with connection to Dublin and Transport for Ireland route 115D provides service to Trim via Kildalkey.

Education
There are two primary schools in the Ballivor region. In the town of Ballivor, there is St. Columbanus National School and Scoil Mhuire Coolronan is located five minutes from the village.

There are no secondary schools in Ballivor but close by there is one in Athboy and Longwood and two in Trim.

Events

Nazi Germany spy Hermann Görtz parachuted into Ballivor in the summer of 1940.

The Ballivor Horse Show has been held every June since the early 1970s.

In 2003, the bog body, the "Clonycavan Man" was found in Clonycavan, Ballivor, Co.Meath. It is now shown in the exhibition, Kingship and Sacrifice at the National Museum of Ireland.

Notable people

 Mary Brück, astronomer
 Thomas Poynton, Catholic missionary
 F. R. Higgins, poet and manager of the Abbey Theatre
 Richard Corrigan, chef

See also 
List of populated places in Ireland

References 

Towns and villages in County Meath